The Bonetta group was a batch of eight sloops of wooden construction built for the Royal Navy during 1732. Seven were ordered on 4 May 1732 to a common specification prepared by Jacob Allin, the Surveyor of the Navy. An additional vessel – Trial (which had been ordered on 16 November 1731, but suspended on 7 January 1732) – was re-ordered on 6 July to be built to the same specification. The actual individual design was left up to the Master Shipwright in each Royal Dockyard at which they were built (except for Hound and Trial, which were built by Deptford's Master Shipwright – Richard Stacey – but were to a design by Jacob Allin).

Although fitted with snow rigs and initially armed with eight 3-pounder guns, except Shark which was rigged as a ketch and fitted with 4-pounders, this group was built with seven pairs of gunports on the upper deck (each port flanked by two pairs of row-ports).

Vessels 

The following is a list of the dimensions and tonnages of the individual vessels:

References 

McLaughlan, Ian. The Sloop of War 1650–1763. Seaforth Publishing, 2014. .
Winfield, Rif. British Warships in the Age of Sail 1714–1792: Design, Construction, Careers and Fates. Seaforth Publishing, 2007. .

Sloop classes